Monte Pissis is an extinct volcano on the border of La Rioja and Catamarca provinces, Argentina,  from the Chilean border.
Monte Pissis is named after Pedro José Amadeo Pissis, a French geologist who worked for the Chilean government.  
Due to its location in the Atacama Desert, the mountain has very dry conditions but there is an extensive glacier (with crevasses, which is unique in the region)

Elevation
Ten years later, with the use of higher precision systems, several other surveys proved that those measurements were inaccurate: in 2005, an Austrian team performed a DGPS survey of Pissis' summit and found the elevation to be . This was later confirmed by a 2007 Chilean-Argentine-European expedition, which surveyed both Ojos del Salado and Monte Pissis and provisionally found the former to be  and the latter .

Geology 
Monte Pissis is a large andesitic-dacitic volcanic centre. It was formed between 6.6 and 6.2 million years ago. Like Cerro Bonete Chico it is one of the large volcanic complexes formed at that time over a deforming Nazca slab.  Volcanism in the area ceased about 2 million years ago.

Monte Pissis, Cerro Bonete Chico and Incapillo form a large volcanic complex that is among the highest in the world. Incapillo formed after Monte Pissis had ceased erupting, and hydrothermal activity at Incapillo may continue to this day.

Climbing 
Until recently, this mountain had received very little attention. The first successful recorded ascent was achieved in 1937 by Polish climbers Osiecki and Szczepanski. The mountain was not climbed again until 1985.

The opening of mining in the area has resulted in the construction of basic roads in the last 15 years. This has developed the tourism in the Atacama Desert and now more people ascend the mountain, usually with a previous stop in Fiambalá to organise the climb. Approaching it from neighbouring Chile is also possible but involves a longer way.

As the mountain is very high and remote, a long approach is required but the ascent is easy and does not require any specific climbing skill. Usually most teams ascend the peak during December to March, the warmest period of the year.

From the base of the mountain  several days of hike are required.

See also

 Incapillo
 Volcanic Seven Summits
 List of Ultras of South America

References
 11. Villarreal, Bob (2014). "Clawing for the Stars: A Solo Climber in the Highest Andes." ISBN 978-1-4582-1322-8. Site: bobvillarreal.com

Bibliography

Notes

External links

 Pissis in Andeshandbook
 Pissis on Summitpost
 Pissis Jan-2008 climb on Distantpeak

Pissis
Mountains of Catamarca Province
Mountains of La Rioja Province, Argentina
Volcanoes of La Rioja Province, Argentina
Pissis
Pissis
Seven Third Summits
Six-thousanders of the Andes
Miocene stratovolcanoes